Stamsund Church is a parish church of the Church of Norway in Vestvågøy Municipality in Nordland county, Norway. It is located in the village of Stamsund on the island of Vestvågøya. It is the church for the Stamsund parish which is part of the Lofoten prosti (deanery) in the Diocese of Sør-Hålogaland. The white, concrete church was built in a long church style in 1937 using plans drawn up by the architect Sigmund Brænne. The church seats about 500 people.

History
The old Steine Chapel was built in the nearby village of Steine in 1853, but was heavily damaged during a storm on 28 January 1905. The chapel needed to be rebuilt and was no longer usable. During the discussion about the structure of the chapel there was a debate about where the new church would be built. After more than 30 years of debate and discussion, a church was built in Stamsund to replace the old Steine Chapel. The church was consecrated on 13 July 1937 by the Bishop Eivind Berggrav. The church was built with its own crematorium that was in operation until 2002. The church was originally part of the Buksnes parish, but in 1969 it became its own parish.

Priests
The following priests have served at Stamsund Church:
1937-1952: Halvdan Thun
1952-1965: Reidar Mørch
1965-1969: Rolv Beisvåg
1969-1976: Asbjørn Bjarne Reknes
1976-1977: Ivar Ruud
1977-1982: Knut Are Aston Eikrem
1982-1983: Trygve Knutsen
1983-2003: Harold Holtermann
2003-2009: Uffe Kronborg
2009-2010: Jan Sahl
2011-2015: Aud Meaas Sigurdsen
since 2015: Gunnar Már Kristjánsson

Media gallery

See also
List of churches in Sør-Hålogaland

References

Vestvågøy
Churches in Nordland
20th-century Church of Norway church buildings
Churches completed in 1937
1937 establishments in Norway
Long churches in Norway
Concrete churches in Norway